Bidyakut is a union parishad under Nabinagar Upazila, Brahmanbaria District, in the Division of Chittagong, Bangladesh.

Geography
Biddyakut is located in the East-Central region of Bangladesh.

Culture 
Biddyakut has a rich culture dating back to early history. The celebration of Pohela Boishakh is popular in the Biddyakut Union. Both Hindu and Muslim traditions influence the culture of Biddyakut/Nabinagar/Brahmanbaria.

The celebration of Ekushey February on International Mother Language Day is popular. People give flowers to the monument of Shahid Minar in respect of people died in Bengali language movement.

Education has been improving in Biddyakut. A few decades ago the literacy rate was only around 36%, now it's near 70%.

Education
There are no colleges, 1 high school, 2 Madrasas, 2 government primary schools and 3 non-government kindergarten.

List of high school in Biddyakut/Nabinagar/Brahmanbaria/Brahmanbaria:

 - Bidyakut Amar High School

List of non-government kindergarten.
- Sunrise pre-cadet school. It is 1no. of kindergarten school in Nabinagor Upazila. It has about 400 students.

References

Unions of Nabinagar Upazila